Accident of Birth is the fourth studio album by Bruce Dickinson, released on 3June 1997 through Castle Communications' sublabel Raw Power in the UK and through CMC International in the US.

Dickinson's second collaboration with guitarist/producer Roy Z, the album is markedly different in style from his previous effort, Skunkworks. As well as RoyZ, Dickinson was joined for the album by fellow former Iron Maiden member Adrian Smith; both Dickinson and Smith would later return to their former band in early 1999. Thanks to the slightly bigger success of this album than his previous solo releases, Dickinson would continue to work with RoyZ on his subsequent albums, The Chemical Wedding (1998) and Tyranny of Souls (2005).

Album artwork
The cover art was produced by Derek Riggs, best known for being the creator of Iron Maiden's mascot, Eddie, and the artwork on all of Iron Maiden's albums, singles, posters and tour brochures throughout 1980–1990 (and sporadically afterwards up until 2000's Brave New World, other than one additional Eddie drawing for the cover of his book Run for Cover). In reference to this, the jester puppet featured on the cover was jokingly christened Edison ("Eddie's Son"). A grim reaper is also faintly visible in the background, such a figure having previously been included by Riggs in his artwork for Iron Maiden's Live After Death and Somewhere in Time albums, as well as on the band's earlier single "The Trooper".

Four versions of the album cover exist. Originally, the artwork showed Edison graphically bursting from a man's stomach, but for the original European release this image was cropped to remove the man's head (although the poster that came with the limited edition of the album included the original, unedited image). The cover was deemed too explicit for the US market, where the album was instead released with completely different artwork showing a frontal view of Edison. The 2005 re-release again used a different image for the cover, showing the puppet nailed to a cross; this image had previously been used for the Japan-only "Man of Sorrows" single. Finally, the extended edition of the album features the original, unedited artwork, with the head of the man from whom Edison is bursting clearly visible.

Critical reception

The German magazine Rock Hard previewed Accident of Birth as the "Album of the Month" in May 1997. The reviewer praised Dickinson's voice and the songwriting: "Bruce sings like a young god – actually better and more expressive than ever – and has based his songwriting on the milestones of his Maiden years, with the new/old sidekick Adrian Smith coming at the right time" to deliver "their best material since Seventh Son of a Seventh Son". In 2005, Accident of Birth was ranked number 338 in Rock Hard magazine's book of The 500 Greatest Rock & Metal Albums of All Time.

Contemporary reviews are equally positive. Stephen Thomas Erlewine of AllMusic defined the album "intriguing" and "better than many latter-day Maiden efforts". Canadian journalist Martin Popoff described Accident of Birth as "an unabashed metal record, produced smoothly and firmly" and added that it "would have made an intelligent, and ironically daring Maiden reunion record".

Track listing

2005 Expanded Edition Disc 2
An extended edition of the album was released with the following tracks on CD 2. Tracks 1–4 appear on the CD single of "Man of Sorrows". Tracks 5–9 also feature on the Japanese CD release of "Man of Sorrows".

Personnel
Band members
 Bruce Dickinson – vocals
 Adrian Smith – guitar
 Roy Z – guitar, Mellotron, piano, producer, engineer, mixing
 Eddie Casillas – bass
 David Ingraham –  drums

Additional musicians
 Silvia Tsai – violin on "Taking the Queen", "Man of Sorrows" and "Arc of Space"
 Rebecca Yeh – cello on "Taking the Queen", "Man of Sorrows" and "Arc of Space"
 Richard Baker – piano on "Man of Sorrows"

Production
Stan Katayama – engineer, mixing at Brooklyn Recordings, Los Angeles except tracks 2, 6, 9
Joe Floyd – engineer, mixing on tracks 2, 6, 9 at Silver Cloud Recordings
Greg Fidelman, Tom Banghart – assistant engineers
Norbert Newfied – string arrangements

Charts

Album

Singles

Accident of Birth

References

1997 albums
Bruce Dickinson albums
CMC International albums
Albums produced by Roy Z
Albums recorded at Sound City Studios
Castle Communications albums